Mexican mythology may refer to:
Aztec mythology
Maya mythology
Olmec religion

See also 
Mesoamerican religion